Air transport usually refers to aviation.

Air transport may also refer to:

Air Transport Services Group, an American aviation holding company
Air Transport International, an American charter airline
Aero Trasporti Italiani, a defunct Italian airline